Jeremiah is a 1998 American made-for-television biblical epic drama film produced for RAI and starring Patrick Dempsey as the Biblical prophet Jeremiah. The film originally aired on RAI network on December 14, 1998 (Italy) and PAX TV on August 27, 2000 (United States). It is also part of TNT's Bible Collection series.

Plot
The story of the prophet Jeremiah, who lived 400 years after King Solomon in a Jerusalem that experiences the Babylonian invasion. Jeremiah is called upon by God to preach the return of justice and faith to those who have lost their way and turned to false idols.

Cast
Patrick Dempsey as Jeremiah
Oliver Reed as General Safan
Klaus Maria Brandauer as King Nebuchadnezzar
Vincent Regan as King Zedekiah
Leonor Varela as Judith
Andrea Occhipinti as King Joiakim
Michael Cronin as Chelkia
Stuart Bunce as Baruch ben Neriah
Roger May as Elshuma 
Simon Kunz as Gemariah
Silas Carson as Hananiah
Damian Myerscough as Ephraim
Chris Pavlo as Hanamel
Luke Sheppard as Child Jeremiah

See also
Book of Jeremiah
Jeremiah 1
Jeremiah 11
Jeremiah 28
Jeremiah 38
Jeremiah 40

References

External links
 

1998 television films
1998 films
1990s biographical films
1998 drama films
American biographical drama films
Films set in the 7th century BC
Films set in Jerusalem
Films based on the Hebrew Bible
Religious epic films
Jeremiah
Bible Collection
RAI original programming
Films directed by Harry Winer
American drama television films
1990s American films